Bernard Berthod (born September 13, 1952 in Lyon, France) physician, historian, writer and presenter of exhibitions from Lyon, France.

His father ran a number of business in the silk trade on the la Croix Rousse mount. He studied medical studies and odontostomatology and undertook a thesis on Jean-Jacques de Gorla, Lyon surgeon and father-Molière. He then began studying history where he undertook a thesis at the University of Lyon III on the Lyon silversmith Armand Calliat for which he received a degree of Doctor of Letters.

Exhibitions
 In 1983, Religious Anjou and Goldsmiths the XIXe siècle in Angers
 In 1986, Bossan and Armand Calliat in Museum of Fine Arts of Lyon
 In 1993, Silk yarn Chambord
 In 1994, Liturgical Treasure of the Cathedral of Moulins, the General Council of the Allier
 In 1995, The Sacred Heart of Montmartre with the City of Paris
 In 2001, 20 centuries Cathedral at the Museum of Tau Reims
 In 2003, Froment-Meurice Goldsmiths at the Museum of Romantic Life
He regularly during seminar s organized by the National Heritage School and the DRAC on matters concerning the liturgy and sacred art at XIXe and XXe siècle.

Books and papers
Bernard Berthod is also the author of numerous scholarly articles and co-wrote and directed: the Historical Dictionary of fabrics (Editions de l'Amateur, Paris, 1994)
 le Dictionnaire historique des étoffes (Editions de l'Amateur, Paris, 1994) 
le Dictionnaire des Arts liturgiques ( Editions de l'Amateur, Paris, 1996)
le Dictionnaire iconographique des Saints (Editions de l'Amateur, Paris, 1999)
les Trésors inconnus du Vatican (Editions de l'Amateur, Paris, 2001)
Goudji (Editions de l'Amateur, Paris, 2002)
le Dictionnaire des objets de dévotion (Editions de l'Amateur, Paris, 2006)
l’Histoire de l’Eglise de Lyon (La Taillanderie, Châtillon-sur-Chalaronne, 2007)
Do ut Des, les ex voto lyonnais et Lyon de A à Z (La Taillanderie, Châtillon-sur-Chalaronne, 2008)
Grandes figures de l'Ordre de Malte (Arpège, Perpignan, 2010)
Goudji, des mains d'or et de Feu (Thalia, Paris, 2011) 
le Dictionnaire des Arts liturgiques du moyen-âge à nos jours (Frémur, Châteauneuf-sur-Charente, 2015)
He is a member of the International Council of Museums (ICOM) since 1992 and vice president of ICOM Costume since 2013

Awards
  chevalier de l'Ordre national du Mérite en 2009.
  chevalier (1997) puis officier (2005) de l'Ordre des Arts et des Lettres.
  chevalier de l'Ordre de Saint-Grégoire-le-Grand (Saint-Siège) en 2006.
  chevalier de l'Ordre de l'Étoile de la solidarité italienne (République italienne) en 2009.
  chevalier Grand-Croix de l'Ordre du Saint-Sépulcre de Jérusalem en 2014.
In November 2007, he won the Académie des Sciences Morales et Politiques: it receives the price of the Canon Delpeuch Foundation, "for all of his work and its action in favor of religious heritage".

References

Writers from Lyon
1952 births
Living people
21st-century French historians
French dentists
University of Lyon alumni
Knights of the Holy Sepulchre